The 2003 Women's Indoor Hockey World Cup was the inaugural edition of the women's indoor hockey tournament. The event was held from 5–9 February in Leipzig, Germany.

Germany won the title for the first time after defeating the Netherlands 5–2 in the final. France finished in third place, defeating the Czech Republic 3–1 in the third place playoff.

Teams
The following teams competed in the tournament:

 (host nation)

Officials
The following umpires were appointed by the FIH to officiate the tournament:

Lynette Hill (AUS)
Dawn Henning (ENG)
Louise Knipe (ENG)
Ute Conen (GER)
Heike Malina (GER)
Mirjam Wessel-Verwer (NED)
Irina Sivtsova (RUS)
Jean Duncan (SCO)
Anne McRae (SCO)
Ludmila Pastorova (SVK)
Monica Rivera (ESP)

Results
All times are local (UTC+01:00).

Preliminary round

Pool A

Pool B

Classification round

Fifth to twelfth place classification

Eleventh and twelfth place

Ninth and tenth place

Seventh and eighth place

Fifth and sixth place

First to fourth place classification

Semi-finals

Third and fourth place

Final

Statistics

Final standings

References

Indoor Hockey World Cup
Indoor Hockey World Cup Women
Women's Indoor Hockey World Cup
International women's indoor hockey competitions hosted by Germany
Indoor Hockey World Cup Women
Sports competitions in Leipzig
World Cup